Lethrinops turneri is a species of cichlid native to Lake Malawi and Lake Malombe.  This species grows to a length of  SL. The specific name honours the ichthyologist George F. Turner of Bangor University in Wales who worked on the fish and fisheries of Lakes Malawi and Malombe and who was the first to report this species in those waters.

References

turneri
Taxa named by Benjamin Peter Ngatunga
Taxa named by Jos Snoeks
Fish described in 2003
Taxonomy articles created by Polbot